Bukhlu (also Romanized as Būkhlū; also known as Bokhalū and Būkhalū) is a village in Chehel Cheshmeh-ye Gharbi Rural District, Sarshiv District, Saqqez County, Kurdistan Province, Iran. At the 2006 census, its population was 252, in 41 families. The village is populated by Kurds.

References 

Towns and villages in Saqqez County
Kurdish settlements in Kurdistan Province